Breathe is an upcoming thriller action-adventure film directed by Stefon Bristol, written by Doug Simon. And it stars Sam Worthington, Jennifer Hudson, Milla Jovovich, Quvenzhané Wallis, and Common.

Cast 
 Sam Worthington as Lucas
 Jennifer Hudson as Maya
 Milla Jovovich as Tess
 Quvenzhané Wallis as Zora
 Common as Darius
 Raúl Castillo as Micah
 Dan Martin as Mike

Production 
In May, 2022 it was announced from Deadline Hollywood that Sam Worthington is cast alongside Jennifer Hudson, Milla Jovovich, Quvenzhané Wallis and Common are set to star in the film directed by Stefon Bristol and written by Doug Simon.

Filming takes place on location in Pennsylvania, which is in post-production.

References

External links 
 

Upcoming films
2020s English-language films
Films shot in Pennsylvania
Films directed by Stefon Bristol
American action thriller films